Sandrelli is an Italian surname. Notable people with the surname include:

 Amanda Sandrelli (born 1964), Italian actress
 Patrizio Sandrelli (born 1950), Italian singer-songwriter
 Stefania Sandrelli (born 1946), Italian actress

Italian-language surnames
Patronymic surnames
Surnames from given names